Manteno Community Unit School District 5 serves the area of Manteno, and the Townships of Rockville, Sumner, Bourbonnais, and a portion of Wesley Township, Will County.

The school district consists of four schools: Manteno Elementary School, Manteno Primary School, Manteno Middle School, and Manteno Community High School.

Manteno Primary School
Manteno Primary School was built in 1926 it is the oldest school in the district. Originally Manteno's first high school. It served as the high school from 1926-1954. Then it became Manteno Elementary School, and Junior High School, In 1963 and addition was added to add more classroom space. From 1954-1974 this school served K-8. From 1974-2001 this school served as Manteno Elementary School. The original building was torn down in 2013, lasting 99 years. The new early childhood center at the current Manteno Elementary School filled the role of the previous 99-year-old building.

Manteno Elementary School
This school is the newest school to the district, Broke ground in 1999 and opened in 2001. You can see this school from Interstate 57. This school serves grades 2-4. After the 2011-2012 school year, Manteno Elementary School is building a massive addition to the school. After it is completed, this will house Pre-K and Kindergarten and 1st grade.

Manteno Middle School
Manteno Middle School was built in 1953 and opened in 1955. This school was the second high school. This school served as the high school from 1955-1974. Additions were built in 1963 and 1994 which added more classroom space. The newest addition was built in 2007 which added 18 more classrooms and a new gym. The building went under renovation too. This school serves grades 5-8.

Manteno Community High School
The High School was built in 1974. The high school was built for 300 students. In 2003 Manteno Community High School put an 8 classroom addition as well as a second gym and a new greenhouse and a new sports complex. In 2006 when voters approved a referendum Manteno Community High School put a 28 classroom addition, added more commons space a new office and a new parking lot for the staff. The current high school can now hold 1,350 students. As of the start of the 2011-2012 school there were 639 students enrolled.

Future Expansion
As Manteno continues to grow, Manteno will need more schools. The School district bought  of land west of Manteno. This land will be used as future growth of the schools. Since the large land purchase the land has remained undeveloped whilst Manteno CUSD 5 began renovations on all present standing schools.

Athletics
Manteno Community High School is a member of the IHSA and a member of the Interstate Eight Conference.

Achievements
1977,1978 Boys Cross Country State Finalist 
1982 Girls Volleyball, Regional Champions, Sectional Champions 
1984 Girls Volleyball, Regional Champions, Sectional Champions, Class A Elite Eight  
1985 Girls Softball, Regional Champions
1987 Girls Volleyball, Regional Champions, Sectional Champions, Class A Elite Eight 
1988 Girls Volleyball, Regional Champions, Sectional Champions, Class A Elite Eight 
1989 Girls Volleyball, Regional Champions, Sectional Champions, Class A Elite Eight
1989 Girls Track & Field Sectional Champions, 3rd in the State
1990 Boys Golf State Finalist
1990 Girls Basketball, Regional Champions 
1991 Girls Basketball, Regional Champions, Sectional Runner-Up
1995 Girls Softball, Regional Champions
1996 Girls Softball, Regional Champions
1997 Boys Soccer, Regional Champions, Sectional Champions, State Finalist  
1997 Girls Softball, Regional Champions
2004 Girls Soccer, Regional Champions, Sectional Runner-Up
2004 Girls Softball, Regional Champions, Sectional Runner-Up
2005 Boys Golf, Regional Champions, Sectional Champions, 4th in the State
2006 Boys Basketball, Regional Champions 
2006 Girls Softball, Regional Champions
2006 Boys Baseball, Regional Champions, Sectional Runner-Up
2007 Girls Softball, Regional Champions
2007 Boys Soccer, Sectional Champions, Class A Elite Eight
2009 Girls Soccer, Regional Champions, Sectional Champions, Class 1A State Champions
2009 Girls Volleyball, Regional Champions
2010 Girls Soccer, Regional Champions, Sectional Champions, Class 1A State Runner Up 2nd in the State
2011 Wrestling, Regional Champions 
2012 Wrestling, Regional Champions 
2012 Girls Soccer, Regional Champions, Sectional Champions, Class 1A State Runner Up 2nd in the State
2013 Girls Soccer, Regional Champions, Sectional Champions, Class 1A Elite Eight
2014 Girls Soccer, Regional Champions, Sectional Champions, Supersectional Champions, Class 1A State Champions
2015 Football, I-8 Large Conference Champions, Class 4A, Quarter final Playoff team.

Athletics Offered

Baseball (Spring)
Basketball (Winter)
Cheerleading (Fall and Winter)
Cross Country (Fall)
Football (Fall)
Golf (Fall)
Soccer (Boys Fall, Girls Spring)
Softball (Spring)
Track and Field (Spring)
Volleyball (Fall)
Wrestling (Winter)
Chess (Fall)

FFA
Manteno Community High School has an outstanding FFA program. In 2008 Manteno FFA Chapter will celebrate its 70th anniversary. Manteno FFA has a state of the art greenhouse. Manteno FFA was voted one of the top FFA Chapters in the State of Illinois. Manteno High School has had an Agriculture program since 1938.

References

External links
 

School districts in Illinois
Education in Kankakee County, Illinois
School districts in Will County, Illinois
1926 establishments in Illinois
School districts established in 1926